Kaleb Eleby (born March 13, 2000) is an American football quarterback for the Houston Roughnecks of the XFL. He played college football at Western Michigan.

High school career
Eleby attended Pattonville High School in Maryland Heights, Missouri. During his career he had 9,735 passing yards and 95 touchdowns. He committed to the Western Michigan University to play college football.

College career
Eleby entered his first year at Western Michigan in 2018 as a backup to Jon Wassink, before starting the final five games due to Wassink being injured. For the season he completed 92 of 147 passes for 1,092 yards, four touchdowns and three interceptions. After redshirting 2019, he took over as the full-time starter in 2020. He finished the season completing 98 of 152 passes for 1,699 yards, 18 touchdowns and two interceptions. Eleby returned as the starter in 2021.

On January 4, 2022, Eleby declared for the 2022 NFL Draft.

Professional career

Houston Roughnecks 

Eleby was selected by the Houston Roughnecks in the 2023 XFL Draft.

References

External links
Western Michigan Broncos bio

2000 births
Living people
Players of American football from Missouri
American football quarterbacks
Western Michigan Broncos football players
Houston Roughnecks players
People from St. Louis County, Missouri
Sportspeople from St. Louis County, Missouri